Neshannock Township is a township in Lawrence County, Pennsylvania, United States. The population was 9,609 at the 2010 census.

The township derives its name from Neshannock Creek, a Native American name purported to mean "double stream".

Geography
According to the United States Census Bureau, the township has a total area of 17.4 square miles (45.0 km2), of which 17.3 square miles (44.9 km2) is land and 0.1 square miles (0.2 km2), or 0.34%, is water. The word Neshannock means "land between two waters".

The township includes the New Castle Northwest census-designated place, as well as the communities of Walmo, Coaltown, Painter Hill, Kings Chapel, and Sunset Valley.

Demographics
As of the census of 2020, there were 9,843 people, 4,180 households residing in the township.  The population density was 570.9 people per square mile (218.1/km2).  There were 3,978 housing units at an average density of 229.6/sq mi (88.6/km2).  The racial makeup of the township was 96.3% White, 1.6% African American, 0.11% Native American, 1.2% Asian, 0.01% Pacific Islander, 0.01% from other races, and 0.9% from two or more races. Hispanic or Latino of any race were 1.5% of the population.

There were 4,180 households, out of which 25.5% had children under the age of 18 living with them, 62.6% were married couples living together, 6.9% had a female householder with no husband present, and 28.5% were non-families. 27.0% of all households were made up of individuals, and 17.9% had someone living alone who was 65 years of age or older.  The average household size was 2.36 and the average family size was 2.86.

In the township the population was spread out, with 16.1% under the age of 18, 4.8% from 18 to 24, 22.1% from 25 to 44, 26.7% from 45 to 64, and 27.5% who were 65 years of age or older.  The median age was 47 years. For every 100 females there were 86.0 males.  For every 100 females age 18 and over, there were 81.9 males.

The median income for a household in the township was $74,755, and the median income for a family was $54,036.The per capita income for the township was $46,852.  About 1.7% of families and 3.8% of the population were below the poverty line, including 2.4% of those under age 18 and 7.1% of those age 65 or over.

Homes in Neshannock range from city street living on the edge of New Castle to larger country-style houses with several acres.

Weather

Records
The highest recorded temperature was 102 °F in 1935. The lowest recorded temperature was -29 °F in 1930.

Facts
July is usually the warmest month. Most of the time, the coolest month is January.

Schools
Neshannock Township's only school district is Neshannock Township School District. The school is one building divided into two parts by a set of doors. Neshannock Memorial School serves grades K-6, and Neshannock Junior/Senior High School serves 7th-12th graders.

Public transportation
Neshannock's public transportation is served by the New Castle Transit Authority. They make many stops in Neshannock and go as far away as Pittsburgh.

Roadways
Neshannock's main roadway is Pennsylvania State Route 18 which runs through downtown New Castle and the center of Neshannock. Locals know it as simply "18" or "Wilmington Road". Mitchell Road has a leg that goes from Wilmington Road and merges into I-376. I-376 then leads to I-80, I-76 and other major Western Pennsylvania roads.

Air travel
The closest airport to Neshannock is New Castle Municipal Airport in nearby Union Township. The closest airport with commercial service is Youngstown-Warren Regional Airport in Ohio. Most residents use Pittsburgh International Airport, about 40 minutes away, because of the much wider variety of destinations in the US, the Caribbean, Canada, Europe, and Mexico.

Recreation and sports 
Neshannock Towhship's main recreation center is Pearson Park, which includes a members-only community pool, a playground, two Little League baseball fields, a party center (the Hutchison Center), a 1-mile walking trail, six tennis courts, a basketball court, and a volleyball court. Neshannock High School’s tennis team's home court is at the park's tennis courts.

Also part of Neshannock Township’s Pearson Park is Hess Ice Rink and Baseball Field. Hess Ice Rink is where ice hockey is played, figure skating is taught, and has public skating when the facility is open. Hess Ice Rink is the home ice of Hess Figure Skating Club. The rink is home of the Dallas Stars defenseman, Stephen Johns.

The New Castle Country Club is in Neshannock Township. The club has a golf course, tennis courts, putting green, and a driving range. They also have a restaurant and an area for parties.

References

External links

Populated places established in 1798
Townships in Lawrence County, Pennsylvania